Shahbano Bilgrami is a writer, editor, poet, and book/film reviewer.

Biography
Though born in Rawalpindi, Pakistan, Shahbano spent her early life in Montreal, Quebec, Canada. Due to her interest in literature, she was awarded a variety of prizes in essay and creative-writing contests throughout high school. In 1991, she and her family moved back to her country of origin, where she completed her A Levels. Shahbano then went on to the University of London to complete a BA Honours in English and an MA in Twentieth Century Literature from King's College London. She has lived in Morgantown, West Virginia with her husband and two daughters since 2002.

During her eight years at the Karachi branch of the Oxford University Press, she was an editor and writer for the Education Division. While working there, she wrote and contributed to many textbooks aimed at children.

In 1997, her poetry was published in An Anthology, by the Oxford University Press. It is a collection of poetry written by poets of Pakistani origin. Without Dreams, Shahbano's first full-length novel, has been placed on the longlist for the Man Asian Literary Prize 2007.

Awards and honours
2007, longlisted, Man Asian Literary Prize

References

Sources
Harper Collins Biography
Man Asia Literary Prize Biography
A book review by Shahbano Bilgrami

1973 births
Living people
Alumni of King's College London
Pakistani women writers
People from Rawalpindi District